The Gran Canaria Maratón is an annual marathon and half-marathon running competition in Las Palmas de Gran Canaria, the largest city in Canary Islands (Spain), organized by the local Cabildo de (government of) Gran Canaria.

The race was first held in 2010, but the half marathon distance had been disputed eight times before.

The race takes place in January, with average temperatures of 20 °C (68 °F). The start and finish is in the same point. The course goes all over the city. The half marathoners run one lap, while the marathon race consists of two. The course is flat.

List of winners

Gallery

References

External links
Official website

Marathons in Spain
Athletics competitions in Spain
Sport in Las Palmas